(born 1948) is a Japanese actor who is known for various cameo appearances in numerous movies.

Full credits

External links

news.yahoo.com

Japanese male actors
Japanese kendoka
Japanese expatriates in the United States
1948 births
Living people
Place of birth missing (living people)